Richard Newell Boyd (May 19, 1942 – February 20, 2021) was an American philosopher, who spent most of his career teaching philosophy at Cornell University where he was Susan Linn Sage Professor of Philosophy and Humane Letters Emeritus. He specialized in epistemology, the philosophy of science, language, and mind.

Education and career
Boyd became interested in the philosophy of science during his undergraduate studies for a mathematics major at MIT for which he was awarded an S.B. in 1963. He then, at the same institution and under the directorship of Richard Cartwright, went on to earn his Ph.D in 1970 with a doctoral thesis on mathematical logic titled A Recursion-Theoretic Characterization of the Ramified Analytical Hierarchy. (He would also co-author, with Gustav Hensel and Hilary Putnam, a 1969 paper by this title.)

After teaching at Harvard University, the University of Michigan, Ann Arbor, and the University of California, Berkeley, Boyd taught, from 1972, at the Sage School of Philosophy at Cornell University. In 1981 he was appointed as the Susan Linn Sage Professor of Philosophy there, a position he retained until his retirement, as professor emeritus, in 2017.

Boyd held visiting positions at Claremont-McKenna College (2012),  the University of Canterbury in Christchurch, New Zealand (2016), and the University of Melbourne in Melbourne, Victoria, Australia. And, after his retirement from Cornell, he also taught at Lewis & Clark College.

Philosophical work 
Boyd was best known for his arguments in favor of scientific realism and moral realism.

In the case of scientific realism, Boyd was a defender of what is called "the miracle argument" according to which if successful scientific theories "were far from the truth...the fact that they are so successful would be miraculous. And given the choice between a straightforward explanation of success and a miraculous explanation, clearly one should prefer the non-miraculous explanation, viz. that our best theories are approximately true."

In the case of moral realism, he was a key figure in the meta-ethical school known as "Cornell Realism."  On this view, a moral property like "goodness is a complex natural property that is not directly observable, but nonetheless has a robust causal profile....  'Goodness' is not synonymous with any simpler set of more directly observable claims. Instead, 'goodness' describes the functionally complex natural property that is the effect of certain characteristic causes, and the cause of certain characteristic effects."

Boyd, along with Hilary Putnam and Jerry Fodor, was also influential in the development of an anti-reductionist form of materialism in the philosophy of mind. In this view, although all individual psychological states and processes are entirely constituted by physical entities, the "explanations, natural kinds, and properties in psychology do not reduce to counterparts in more basic sciences, such as neurophysiology or physics."

The American philosopher Jason Josephson Storm has adapted Boyd's account of biological natural kinds, which is focused on "homeostatic property-clusters," to develop an account of social kinds. Drawing on process philosophy, Storm argues that social kinds are studied by the human sciences and are more fluid and interdependent than classical natural kinds, while showing broad structural similarities to biological natural kinds as described by Boyd.

Select works 
More complete publication details at Boyd's PhilPapers listing, copies of further papers at his homepage's Selected Publications

Select papers and book chapters 
 "Determinism, Laws and Predictability in Principle," Philosophy of Science (1972).
 "Scientific Realism and Naturalistic Epistemology," PSA 80, vol. 2 (1980).
"What Materialism Does Not Imply," in Readings in the Philosophy of Psychology Volume I, ed. N.J. Block (1981).
 "On the Current Status of the Issue of Scientific Realism," Erkenntnis (1983).
 "Observations, Explanatory Power and Simplicity," in Experiment and Observation in Modern Science, ed. Achinstein and Hannaway (1984).
 "Lex Orandi est Lex Credendi," in Images of Science: Scientific Realism Versus Constructive Empiricism, ed. Churchland and Hooker (1984).
 "The Logician's Dilemma: Deductive Logic, Inductive Inference and Logical Empiricism," Erkenntnis (1985).
 "How to be a Moral Realist," in Essays on Moral Realism, ed. Sayre McCord (1988).
 "Constructivism, Realism, and Philosophical Method," in J. Earman, ed. Inference, Explanation, and Other Philosophical Frustrations. University of California Press (1992).
 "Metaphor and Theory Change," in Metaphor and Thought, ed. Ortony (1993)

Edited books 
Boyd, Richard; Gasper, Philip; Trout, J. D. (1991). The Philosophy of Science. MIT Press. .

See also
American philosophy
List of American philosophers

Notes

External links 
"Objective Truth" Boyd on The Philosophers Zone podcast with host Alan Saunders (2008) 
"Evolutionary theory as methodological anesthesia" (2011) video/podcast of 'Debating Darwin: evolutionary psychology" lecture for UCTV. 
"Is Evolutionary Psychology Misleading Us?" (2012) video of lecture for the Marian Miner Cook Athenaeum of Claremont McKenna College.
"Richard Boyd: Reconciling Realism and Neo-Kantian Social Constructivism" video of Science - Big Questions Revisited lecture for the Symposium on Occasion of the Farewell of Paul Hoyningen-Huene from Hannover (18 July 2014)

1942 births
2021 deaths
20th-century American essayists
20th-century American male writers
20th-century American philosophers
21st-century American essayists
21st-century American male writers
21st-century American philosophers
Action theorists
American ethicists
American logicians
American male essayists
American philosophy academics
Analytic philosophers
Cornell University faculty
Epistemologists
Harvard University faculty
Kant scholars
Metaphor theorists
Metaphysicians
Metaphysics writers
Moral realists
Ontologists
Philosophers from Washington, D.C.
Philosophers of education
Philosophers of language
Philosophers of logic
Philosophers of mathematics
Philosophers of mind
Philosophers of psychology
Philosophers of science
Philosophers of social science
Philosophers of biology
University of Michigan faculty